Linnwood may refer to:
 Linnwood, Guildford, is a heritage listed house in the Sydney suburb of Guildford, New South Wales
 Linnwood (Ellicott City, Maryland), is a heritage listed house on the NRHP in Maryland

See also
Linwood (disambiguation)
Lynnwood (disambiguation)
Lynwood (disambiguation)